The 1989 Northwestern Wildcats team represented Northwestern University during the 1989 NCAA Division I-A football season. In their fourth year under head coach Francis Peay, the Wildcats compiled a 0–11 record (0–8 against Big Ten Conference opponents) and finished in last place in the Big Ten Conference.

The team's offensive leaders were quarterback Tim O'Brien with 2,218 passing yards, junior running back Bob Christian with 1,291 rushing yards, and Richard Buchanan with 1,115 receiving yards. Buchanan received first-team All-Big Ten honors from the Associated Press, and Christian received second-team honors.

Schedule

Roster

Season summary

at Duke

Air Force

Rutgers

at Indiana

Minnesota

at Wisconsin

Iowa

Ohio State

at Purdue

Purdue snapped a streak of 10 straight games without a first quarter point.

at Michigan State

Illinois

References

Northwestern
Northwestern Wildcats football seasons
College football winless seasons
Northwestern Wildcats football